El Prado (February 3, 1989 – September 21, 2009) was a Thoroughbred racehorse and Champion sire. He was sired by Sadler's Wells, who was a fourteen-time Leading sire in Great Britain & Ireland. Out of the mare, Lady Capulet who won the Irish 1,000 Guineas on her racecourse debut, his damsire was Sir Ivor whose wins included the 1968 Epsom Derby, 2,000 Guineas Stakes, Champion Stakes and Washington, D.C. International Stakes.

Bred by Lyonstown Stud in Cashel, County Tipperary, El Prado was raced by leading British horseman, Robert Sangster, and trained by Vincent O'Brien. Racing at age two, he won four of his six starts including the National Stakes, Railway Stakes and the Beresford Stakes, all at The Curragh Racecourse and ridden by Lester Piggott. He was joint Irish champion 2 year-old. At age three, El Prado finished out of the money in all three starts.

As a sire
Retired to stud duty, El Prado stood at Adena Springs in Midway, Kentucky. The  Leading sire in North America in 2002, as of February 2009 he sired seventy-one stakes winners. Among them are:
 Nite Dreamer (b. 1995) - multiple stakes winner. Career earnings: $1,149,788
 Medaglia d'Oro (b. 1999) - Career earnings: $5,754,720. Leading North American and Australian sire. Sire of Rachel Alexandra and Songbird.
 Artie Schiller (b. 2001) - won Breeders' Cup Mile. Career earnings: $2,088,853. 
 Borrego (b. 2001) - won Grades I Jockey Club Gold Cup, Pacific Classic Stakes. Career earnings: $2,052,090. 
 Fort Prado (b. 2001 ) - 2004 Illinois-bred Champion Three Year Old, 2005 Illinois-bred Champion Older Handicap Male and Male Turf Horse. Career earnings: $1,097,002
 Kitten's Joy (b. 2001) - 2004 American Champion Male Turf Horse. Career earnings: $2,075,791. Leading Sire in the United States
 Asi Siempre (b. 2002) - racing mare whose wins included the Grade I Spinster Stakes. Career earnings: $953,300. Sold for broodmare duty for US$3 million to Sheikh Mohammed.
 Paddy O'Prado (b. 2007) - 3rd in the 2010 Kentucky Derby; sixth in the Preakness; winner of the Colonial Turf Cup and Virginia Derby. 
 Winter Memories (2008) - 1st in the 2010 Miss Grillo Stakes; 2nd in Breeders' Cup Juvenile Fillies Turf; 1st in Appalachian Stakes, Sands Point Stakes and in Lake George Stakes.

Pedigree

References

 El Prado's pedigree and partial racing stats
 El Prado's webpage at Adena Springs

1989 racehorse births
2009 racehorse deaths
Racehorses bred in Ireland
Racehorses trained in Ireland
United States Champion Thoroughbred Sires
Thoroughbred family 1-l
Chefs-de-Race